The Mohanpur Government High School is a school located on the Rajshahi-Nogoan highway in Mohanpur, Rajshahi, Bangladesh. It was founded by Late Kh. Mansur Ali, the first graduate in Mohanpu and first head master of Mohanpur High School in 1947.  Educationist Sir Rakhal Chandraw Das was one of the student of the first batch with Md. Abdul Karim (Teacher of Mohanpur High School) and Kh. Syedul Islam (Post Master of Mohapur) in class VI. It was nationalized in 1987. It is one of the famous institutes of Rajshahi.

References

External links

Educational institutions established in 1947
1947 establishments in Pakistan